HMS Boxer was built as a Landing Ship, Tank (LST(1)) at Harland and Wolff. Launched in December 1942 and commissioned the following April, she saw service as part of the Allied invasion of Italy.

Design and development
Boxer was the next in development of the tank landing ship following the conversion of the Maracaibo tankers into landing ships capable of carrying vehicles. The requirement was for a ship that could carry 13 Churchill tanks, 27 other vehicles and 193 men. As it was expected to have a high speed even when laden for the assault (about 18 knots) it could not have a shallow draught. This in turn meant that an extra long bow ramp had to be added. At  this took up a lot of room inside the ship.

Boxer was laid down at Harland & Wolff's Belfast shipyard on 31 July 1941. She was launched on 12 December 1942 and was completed on 1 August 1943.
 
Boxer had only two sister ships, as plans to build more in the United States led instead to a simpler though slower design capable of similar capacity but with a much shallower draught.

Service

In 1944, she was refitted as a  fighter direction ship, for use during the Normandy landings in controlling fighter aircraft by ground-controlled interception, then as an "action information organisation" tender (a radar training ship) in 1946. In 1953 she took part in the Fleet Review to celebrate the Coronation of Queen Elizabeth II, was placed in reserve in 1956, and scrapped at Barrow-in-Furness in 1958.

Boxer carried the writer/comedian Spike Milligan from North Africa to Italy when he served with the 56th Heavy Regiment Royal Artillery.

See also

References

Publications

Amphibious warfare vessels of the Royal Navy
World War II naval ships of the United Kingdom
Ships built in Belfast
1942 ships
Ships built by Harland and Wolff